Elections were held in Davao Region for seats in the House of Representatives of the Philippines on May 9, 2016

Summary

Compostela Valley

1st District

2nd District
Incumbent Rommel Amatong is term limited and is running for Governor.

Davao City

1st District
Incumbent congressman Karlo Nograles is running for re-election unopposed.

2nd District

3rd District

Davao del Norte

1st District

2nd District

Davao del Sur

Davao Occidental
Lorna Bautista-Bandigan is running unopposed.

Davao Oriental

1st District

2nd District

References

2016 Philippine general election
Lower house elections in the Davao Region